The 120 mm Gun M1 was the United States Army's standard super-heavy anti-aircraft gun during World War II and the Korean War, complementing the smaller and more mobile M2 90 mm gun in service.

The M1 gun was used by the Army for air defense from 1944 to 1960, serving primarily in static defensive roles, although it had been designed to be mobile. It became obsolete with the development of anti-aircraft missiles and was phased out after 1954. However, a derivative mounted in the M103 tank served in that capacity until 1974.

History
The United States Army first worked on a 120 mm gun after the end of World War I, with a prototype being presented in 1924. The system was considered far too heavy and expensive to be useful, and the project slowed, although it was never canceled outright.

In 1938, the Army reviewed its needs for newer AA systems and decided to order new systems for both the heavy and super-heavy role. The former was filled by the new M1 90 mm gun, which replaced the earlier M3 3-inch gun then in use. For the super-heavy role, the 120 mm gun design was dusted off and mated to a new eight-wheel carriage, designated 4.7-inch M1 when it was accepted in 1940.

Like the 90 mm, the M1 gun was typically operated in a battery of four guns, initially with an associated searchlight, SCR-268 radar (replaced later by the much-improved SCR-584), M10 gun director, and M4 Gun Data Computer that automatically laid the guns. The M6 Tractor was used as the prime mover.

The M1 gun entered service late in World War II. One battalion of M1 guns, the 513th AAA Gun Battalion, was deployed in the Philippines in February 1945, but never fired on any hostile aircraft.

After World War II ended and the Cold War with the Soviet Union began, M1 guns were deployed in many locations in the U.S. and Canada. To defend against long range Soviet Tu-4 bomber attack, the Army Anti-Aircraft Command (ARAACOM) formed 44 active duty and 22 National Guard battalions equipped with M1 guns, divided into seven brigades and 20 anti-aircraft artillery groups. Two Canadian anti-aircraft battalions were also equipped with M1 guns for the joint defense of the Soo Locks. These guns were guided by the long range Lashup Radar Network equipped with AN/CPS-5. M1 guns were deployed for the protection of nuclear production facilities, major industrial centers, strategic air force bases, and select major population centers.

In 1954, the MIM-3 Nike Ajax surface-to-air missile became operational with ARAACOM. It substantially outranged the M1 gun, rendering it obsolete. ARAACOM began retiring the M1 gun from active-duty units and then from National Guard units. Then in 1957, the Soviet Union introduced the R-7, its first ICBM, and the M1 gun became practically useless. By January 1960, all remaining National Guard units with M1 guns were converted to Nike missiles or deactivated.

Modification as tank gun
Design studies began in early 1945 to modify the design of the M1 for use as an armament in heavy tank programs, the result of these being designated 120mm gun T53. Two T30 Heavy Tank chassis were diverted to fit the gun, resulting in the T34 Heavy Tank. Firing tests revealed issues with fumes from the gun entering the turret, causing flarebacks and a high concentration of toxic gases in the fighting compartment. As a result of this, the design of the gun was modified to fit a Bore evacuator.

In 1948 a new heavy tank project T43, later to become the M103, was proposed to use a lightened version of the T53. This gun, 120mm gun T122, was balistically identical to the earlier model. The design was further evolved with the T123 design increasing the powder pressure from 38,000psi to 48,000psi, before finally introducing a quick change gun tube with the T123E1. In this form the design was standardised as 120mm gun M58, which would see service in production M103s.

The British heavy tank program, FV214 Conqueror, used a modified version of the M58 design, designated Royal Ordnance L1.

See also
 List of U.S. Army weapons by supply catalog designation (SNL D-32)
 Director (military)
 Rangekeeper
 Gun Data Computer
 Fire-control system
 Kerrison Predictor

Weapons of comparable role, performance and era
 12.8 cm FlaK 40 
 130 mm air defense gun KS-30 
 QF 4.5-inch Mk I – V naval gun 
 Type 3 12 cm AA gun

Notes

References
 TM 9-2300 Standard Artillery and Fire Control Materiel dated 1944
 TM 9-380
 SNL D-32

External links

World War II anti-aircraft guns
Anti-aircraft guns of the United States
Tank guns of the United States
120 mm artillery
Weapons and ammunition introduced in 1944